Transcendence is an outdoor sculpture by Keith Jellum, located in Portland, Oregon, United States. It depicts a fish flying through the brickwork above Southpark Seafood at the northwestern corner of Southwest Salmon Street and Southwest Park Avenue in Downtown Portland.

Seattle Post-Intelligencer said of the sculpture and its relation to the city: "There is much in the way of art there and one cannot get a bad coffee, beer or glass of wine there. People there are friendly and not above being whimsical, perhaps this is why Keith Jellum's installation found a home in Portland?"

See also
 Mimir (sculpture) (1980) and Electronic Poet (1984), other sculptures by Keith Jellum in Portland

References

Animal sculptures in Oregon
Bronze sculptures in Oregon
Fish in art
Outdoor sculptures in Portland, Oregon
Southwest Portland, Oregon